The Allegheny Mountain Collegiate Conference men's basketball tournament is the annual conference basketball championship tournament for the NCAA Division III Allegheny Mountain Collegiate Conference. The tournament has been held annually since the AMCC was founded in 1998. It is a single-elimination tournament and seeding is based on regular season records.

The winner, declared conference champion, receives the AMCC's automatic bid to the NCAA Men's Division III Basketball Championship.

La Roche are the current champions.

Results

Championship records

 Alfred State and Mount Aloysius have not yet qualified for the AMCC tournament finals.
 Schools highlighted in pink are former members of the AMCC.

References

NCAA Division III men's basketball conference tournaments
Basketball, Men's, Tournament
Recurring sporting events established in 1998